The Cornell University Library is the library system of Cornell University. As of 2014, it holds over 8 million printed volumes and over a million ebooks. More than 90 percent of its current 120,000 periodical titles are available online. It is the sixteenth largest library in North America, ranked by number of volumes held. It is also the thirteenth largest research library in the U.S. by both titles and volumes held.

Structure
The library is administered as an academic division; the University Librarian reports to the university provost. The holdings are managed by the Library's subdivisions, which include 16 physical and virtual libraries on the main campus in Ithaca, New York; a storage annex in Ithaca for overflow items; the library of the Weill Cornell Medical College and the archives of the medical college and of New York–Presbyterian Hospital in New York City; a branch of the medical library serving Weill Cornell in Qatar campus in Doha; and the library of the New York State Agricultural Experiment Station in Geneva, New York.

The John M. Olin Library is the primary research library for the social sciences and humanities, and the Harold D. Uris Library has extensive holdings in the humanities and social sciences. The Albert R. Mann Library specializes in agriculture, the life sciences, and human ecology. The Carl M. Kroch Library includes the university's Rare & Manuscript Collections as well as its extensive Asia Collections.

History
Initially, the system was a collection of 18,000 volumes stored in Morrill Hall. Daniel Willard Fiske, Cornell's first librarian, donated his entire estate to the university upon his death, as did President Andrew Dickson White. Under Fiske's direction, Cornell's library introduced a number of innovations, including allowing undergraduate students to browse through the books and check them out. By 1885, the library had installed electric lights and stayed open 12 hours per day (instead of only a few hours per week—as most other libraries at American universities did at the time—just enough time for faculty to check out and return books), which allowed students to use it as a reference library.

Initiatives

The library plays an active role in furthering online archiving of scientific and historical documents. It provides stewardship and partial funding for arXiv.org e-print archive, created at Los Alamos National Laboratory by Paul Ginsparg. arXiv has changed the way many physicists and mathematicians communicate, making the eprint a viable and popular form for announcing new research.

The Project Euclid initiative (named after Euclid of Alexandria) is a resource joining commercial journals with low-cost independent journals in mathematics and statistics. The project is aimed at enabling affordable scholarly communication through the Internet. Besides archival purposes, a primary goal of the project is to facilitate journal searches and interoperability between different publishers.

The Cornell Library Digital Collections are online collections of historical documents. Featured collections include the Database of African-American Poetry, the Historic Math Book Collection, the Samuel May Anti-Slavery Collection, the Witchcraft Collection, and the Donovan Nuremberg Trials Collection.

Rare holdings
The library houses several rare manuscripts. It houses one of the five copies of Abraham Lincoln's Gettysburg Address (1863)—the only such to be privately owned and the only one accompanied both by a letter from Lincoln transmitting the manuscript and by the original envelope addressed and franked by Lincoln. The library houses cuneiform tablets; a major collection of medieval books and witchcraft trial records; thousands of pamphlets produced during the French Revolution; and the correspondence between Jefferson and Lafayette. It also holds a copy of The Birds of America, of which only 120 complete sets are known to exist. The library also has first editions of Charles Darwin's Origin of Species (1859), the Book of Mormon (1830), and of Jane Austen's Pride and Prejudice (1813). The rare manuscript collection also includes a 1st edition copy of Thomas Hobbe's Leviathan from 1651.

Significant collections

Rose Goldsen Archive of New Media Art
Rose Goldsen Archive of New Media Art is a research repository for new media art. It was founded in 2002 by Timothy Murray, Professor of Comparative Literature and English and Director of the Society for the Humanities. It is located in the Division of Rare and Manuscript Collections at Cornell University Library and it is named in the honor of the late Prof. Rose Goldsen, a Sociology Professor at Cornell University and an avant-garde critic of pop culture, mass media and communication.
The Rose Goldsen Archive provides access to detailed archival material that mirrors the historical changes which have happened in new media art in terms of its technological development and experimentation, throughout the years.

General Collection
The archive's collections include multimedia artworks that reflect the transformation of new media art practices from analog to disc-based and from there to networked and web-based application during the past decades. The collections combine artworks produced on CD/ DVD-Rom, VHS/digital video and internet (online and offline holdings) as well as supporting materials, such as unpublished manuscripts and designs, digital and photographic documentation of installations and performances, digital ephemera, interviews, photographs, catalogues, monographs, and resource guides to new media art. The general collection consists of various material about audio/ sound art, eco/ bio art, exhibitions and artist compilations, installations, interactive narrative and poetry, online listserv and internet art journals, performance, theory and critic, video art and cinema. A few artists whose work can be found in the general collection are: Hershman Leeson Lynn, Hill Gary, Iimura Takahiko, Lister Ardele, Snow Michael, Janet Cardiff, Chantal Akerman, Tashiro Charles, Barbier Annette, Jennifer and Kevin McCoy, Shu Lea Cheang, Quintanilla Grace. The collection contains work ranging from the 1960s up to the present day.

Special Collections
Apart from the general collection, the Rose Goldsen Archive of New Media Art houses many special collections and fellowship competitions. Some of them are the following: 
The Renew Media Fellowships in New Media, an annual competition for interactive dynamic media, was funded by Rockefeller Foundation in New Media Art from 2002. The Goldsen Archive serves as the repository for the digitized copies of this competition material, such as the proposals, slides, artists’ portfolios, other supportive material, etc. from 2003 to 2008.
The Wen Pulin Archive of Chinese Avant-Garde Art, a collaboration among the Goldsen Archive, the Charles W. Wason Collection on East Asia at Cornell University Library and the Dongtai Academy of Art in Beijing, China consists of 360 hours of videotape that documents Chinese contemporary art, installation, performance, video, and rock n' roll from 1985 to 2002. Some of the artists that are showcased in the collection are: Cui Jian, Du Zhenjun, Feng Mengbo, Li Xianting, Lin Yilin, Lu Shengzhong, Mou Sen, Song Dong, Song Yongping, Xu Bing, Yu Xiaofu, Zhang Dali, Zhou Shaobo, Chen Lingyang.
The Yao Jui-Chung Archive of Contemporary Taiwanese Art contains the Taiwanese artist Yao Jui-Chung's portfolio, 8,000 images of Contemporary Art Exhibition Postcards and Taiwan performance art.
The "ETC: Experimental Television Center Archives" is a collection with more than 3,000 artistic video tapes and DVDs. It contains works by artists from both the contemporary and first generation of video art. The Rose Goldsen Archive of New Media Art has served as a repository for the Experimental Television Center's collection (1969-2011), since 2011. Some of the artists that are showcased in the collection are Barbara Hammer, Gary Hill, Jud Yalkut, Aldo Tambellini, Benton C Bainbridge, Irit Batsry, Alan Berliner, Kristin Lucas, Lynne Sachs, Michael Betancourt, Abigail Child, Laurence Gartel and Barbara Lattanzi, Emergency Broadcast Network, Nam June Paik, Kathy High, etc.
Net Art: The Goldsen Archive provides access to a number of internet art collections. It is the off-line repository for the Turbulence.org archive, a project of New Radio and Performing Arts, Inc. (NRPA), the Computerfinearts.com and the Infos 2000. In addition, the Archive serves as an on-line repository for the online journal of net.art, CTHEORY Multimedia and the Ecopoetics online exhibition.

Preservation

Because of the fragility and the complexity of the artworks, most of which are born-digital and many of which interactive, the Archive focus on building archival strategies that endure the continuous access to all this fragile material. The Goldsen Archive is one of the six international digital art archives dedicated to Preservation and Documentation Strategies; other similar archives are Ars Electronica, Tate Intermedia, FACT, computerfinearts.com (which has its repository in Goldsen Archive) and Rhizome Artbase. In addition, the Archive has signed the International Declaration "Media Art Needs Global Networked Organization and Support", sponsored by Media Art History. Org. The Goldsen Archive has completed a National Endowment for the Humanities- funded preservation initiative that aims to make the access to complex interactive and digital-born media artworks simple and more reliable, which will allow these artworks to be used and viewed on modern computers.

Other collections
 Agriculture collections
 The Core Historical Literature of Agriculture
 Asia collections
 Echols Collection on Southeast Asia
 Wason Collection on East-Asia
 South Asia Collection
 Cornell Hip Hop Collection 
 Fiske Icelandic Collection 
 Home Economics Archive: Research, Tradition and History (HEARTH)
 Human Sexuality Collection
 Kinematic Models for Design Digital Library (KMODDL) Movies and photos of hundreds of working mechanical-systems models at Cornell University. Also includes an e-book library of classic texts on mechanical design and engineering.
 Making of America Collection 
 Ornithology collection
 Race and Religion Collection 
 The Rose Goldsen Archive of New media Art serves as a repository for many special collections and fellowship competitions, such as:
 The Repository of the Experimental Television Center
 Foundation Fellowships in New Media Art
 The Wen Pulin Archive of Chinese Avant-Garde Art
 The Lynn Hershman Leeson archive
 Samuel May Anti-Slavery Collection
 Witchcraft Collection 
 Other digital collections

Units
Adelson Library (Cornell Lab of Ornithology)
Africana Library (Africana Studies and Research Center)
Catherwood Library (Industrial and Labor Relations Library)
Engineering Library (Carpenter Hall)
Fine Arts Library (Rand Hall)
Geneva Experiment Station Library
Kroch Library: Asia Collections and Rare and Manuscript Collections
Law Library
Management Library (Samuel Curtis Johnson Graduate School of Management, Sage Hall)
Mann Library
Mathematics Library (Malott Hall)
Medical Library (Weill Cornell Medical Library)
Music Library (Lincoln Hall)
Nestlé Library (School of Hotel Administration Library)
Olin & Uris Libraries
Physical Sciences Library (virtual)
Veterinary Library (Flower-Sprecher Veterinary Library)

References

See also
 Google Books Library Project

External links
 Cornell University Library
 Library bridge page
 Special collections
 Cornell University Library's digital collections
 Unit libraries
 Tutorials for library preservation and conservation

Library
Library
University and college academic libraries in the United States
Federal depository libraries
Libraries in New York (state)